Rainer Troppa (born 2 August 1958) is a German former professional footballer who played as a defender. Troppa began his professional career with BSG Energie Cottbus. He was transferred to BFC Dynamo when BSG Energie Cottbus was relegated to second tier DDR-Liga after the 1975-76 DDR-Oberliga season. He played for the East Germany national team, featuring in the unsuccessful qualifying campaigns for the 1982 and 1986 World Cups and the 1984 European Championship.

External links

References 

1958 births
Living people
East German footballers
East Germany international footballers
Association football defenders
FC Energie Cottbus players
Berliner FC Dynamo players
DDR-Oberliga players